WWRQ-FM (107.9 FM) better known as "The Beat" is a radio station broadcasting an urban contemporary format. Licensed to Valdosta, Georgia, United States, the station serves the Valdosta area.  The station is currently owned by Black Crow Media. Before a programming change in 2015, the station was also known as Rock 108 and played classic and modern rock.

References

External links

WRQ